Meaza Ashenafi (born 25 July 1964) is an Ethiopian lawyer. In November 2018, she was appointed by the Federal Parliamentary Assembly as President of the Federal Supreme Court of Ethiopia until her resignation on 17 January 2023.

Personal life and education 

Meaza was born in Asosa, Ethiopia. She attended both elementary and high school in Asosa and join Addis Ababa University Law department. She received a Bachelor of Laws (LL.B.) from Addis Ababa University and Master of Arts (M.A.) degree in international relations and gender studies from the University of Connecticut. She is married to Dr. Araya Asfaw, Professor of Physics at Addis Ababa University, and they have two daughters together.

Career
Meaza served as a Judge of the Federal Supreme Court of Ethiopia between 1989 and 1992. In 1993 she was appointed by the Ethiopian Constitution Commission as a legal adviser. In 1995, Meaza founded the Ethiopian Women Lawyers Association (EWLA), and became its executive director. Through her legal contacts, she has been instrumental in campaigning for women's rights in Ethiopia; her Fighting For Women's Rights In Ethiopia group had approximately 45 graduate lawyers working for it in 2002.

Meaza has held a position with the United Nations Economic Commission for Africa. She helped lead the development of the first women's bank in Ethiopia, Enat Bank, which was established in 2011 and as of 2016 chairs its board of directors. On 1 November 2018, Meaza appointed unanimously by HoPR as the President of the Supreme Court, being the first woman in the cabinet of Prime Minister Abiy Ahmed. After serving four years, she resigned that position with vice president Solomon Areda on 17 January 2023. The Ethiopian parliament appointed Tewdros Mihret as the president and Abeba Embiale as deputy president of the Supreme Court on behalf of Meaza and Solomon respectively.

Political positions
In a 2009 speech Meaza was outspoken on the stereotypes that women face in Ethiopian society, blaming Amharic proverbs for the way women are perceived, portraying them mostly as delicate and weak. The communications tradition over time has used these proverbs to advance men and degrade women. Some of the ideas given by these proverbs are that a woman's place is only in domestic duties and that women in general lack common sense and are irresponsible.

One of these Amharic proverbs that Meaza is alluding to says that a woman can not to be trusted and another conveys the idea that the companionship of a woman is dispersed by a mouse. Another proverb indicates that even if a woman is smart, only a man can be practical to apply knowledge – hinting at gender based roles in urban Ethiopian society, especially in Addis Ababa. Still another of the proverbs she alludes to is of emotional characteristics where the proverb speaks of the courage of a woman as about as useless as a shy priest or a blind donkey.

Recognition
In 2003, Meaza became a Hunger Project Award laureate, winning the Grassroots Ethiopian Women of Substance Africa Prize, Two years later, she was nominated for the Nobel Peace Prize. Her most famous case was turned into the 2014 Ethiopian film Difret, which was promoted by Angelina Jolie as executive producer and went on to win the World Cinematic Dramatic Audience Award at the 2014 Sundance Film Festival.

See also 
 Women in Ethiopia

References

Sources 

1964 births
Living people
Women lawyers
20th-century Ethiopian women
21st-century Ethiopian women
Ethiopian women's rights activists
People from Amhara Region
Ethiopian judges
Women chief justices
Organization founders
Women founders